Yeo Foo Ee Gary (born 30 August 1986) is a former track and field sprint athlete who competes internationally for Singapore. Yeo is a 5-time SEA Games Silver medalist and the 2012 ASEAN University Games 100m Champion. Yeo also represented Singapore in athletics at the 2012 London Olympics, as well as the 2010 and 2014 Asian Games. He was the flag bearer for Singapore at the 2014 Asian Games

Yeo won the silver medal in the Men's 100 metres at the 2011 Southeast Asian Games.

In 2012, Yeo represented Singapore at the 2012 Summer Olympics. In the men's 100m preliminary round, he broke his personal best timing of 10.62secs to 10.57secs to qualify for Round 1. He subsequently finished last in his heat and did not qualify for the next round.

In the same year, Yeo won the gold medal in the 100m  sprint at the 2012 Asean University Games, lowering his personal best timing to 10.44secs as well as qualifying for the SEA Games 2013 in the process.

In 2013, Yeo started training full-time and broke the 4 × 100 m relay record in May with a timing of 39.45secs.

At the 2015 South East Asian games, Yeo was part of the quartet that rewrote the national 4 × 100 m record, finishing 2nd behind Thailand with a time of 39.24s.

Yeo was a former student of Victoria School and is now studying business at the Singapore Management University.

References

External links
 

1986 births
Living people
Olympic athletes of Singapore
Athletes (track and field) at the 2012 Summer Olympics
Singaporean sportspeople of Chinese descent
Singaporean male sprinters
Victoria School, Singapore alumni
Athletes (track and field) at the 2010 Asian Games
Athletes (track and field) at the 2014 Asian Games
Athletes (track and field) at the 2010 Commonwealth Games
Athletes (track and field) at the 2014 Commonwealth Games
Commonwealth Games competitors for Singapore
Southeast Asian Games medalists in athletics
Southeast Asian Games silver medalists for Singapore
Competitors at the 2009 Southeast Asian Games
Competitors at the 2011 Southeast Asian Games
Competitors at the 2013 Southeast Asian Games
Competitors at the 2015 Southeast Asian Games
Asian Games competitors for Singapore